Otomi may refer to:
Otomi people, an indigenous people of Mexico
Otomi language, the language of the Otomi people
Otomi (military), an Aztec military order

See also
Otomys, rat genus
List of -otomies, family of surgical procedures